This article lists the presidents of the Federation of Bosnia and Herzegovina.

Presidents of the Federation of Bosnia and Herzegovina (1994–present)

See also
List of prime ministers of the Federation of Bosnia and Herzegovina
Vice-President of the Federation of Bosnia and Herzegovina

External links
Presidency of the Federation of Bosnia-Hercegovina
World Statesmen –  Federation of Bosnia-Hercegovina

Presidents
Federation of Bosnia and Herzegovina
Presidents of the Federation of Bosnia and Herzegovina